Galinsoga triradiata is a rare Mexican species of flowering plant in the family Asteraceae. It has been found only in the State of Michoacán in western Mexico.

Description
Each head has about 3-5 white ray flowers surrounding as 25-35 yellow disc flowers.

References

triradiata
Flora of Michoacán
Plants described in 1977